is a song written by lyricist Yū Aku and composer Kōichi Morita, originally recorded and released by idol Junko Sakurada.

Although released in December 1974, it became an Oricon number one hit in February 1975, grossing over 527,000 copies. and becoming the 11th best selling single of that year. She performed this song at the 26th edition of Kohaku Uta Gassen in 1975.

The song was included as a bonus track on the album "Spoon Ippai no Shiawase" (Spoonful of Happiness), the soundtrack to her first film.

Track listing (7" Vinyl)

Chart positions

External links
 "Lyrics Lyrics in Kanji.

References 

1974 songs
1975 singles
Songs with lyrics by Yū Aku
Oricon Weekly number-one singles
Songs written by Koichi Morita (songwriter)